Philippe-Ferdinand-Auguste de Rohan-Chabot (1815–1875), comte de Jarnac, was a French diplomat of aristocratic descent.

Descended from the ancient Breton family currently represented by Josselin de Rohan, the 14th Duke. He was the only son of General Louis-Guy-Charles-Guillaume de Rohan by his wife Lady Isabelle Fitzgerald. He succeeded his father in the family titles of vicomte de Chabot and comte de Jarnac.
Educated at Harrow School
After leading the expedition which returned Emperor Napoleon's remains from Saint Helena,
He withdrew from Diplomatic Work 1848-1870 and Lived on his estates in Kilkenny, Ireland.
He was later appointed, in 1871, French Ambassador to the United Kingdomand was Ambassador again 1874-1875.

He Died in London 22nd May 1845

Honours 
  Grand Officier of the Légion d'honneur
  Honorary Knight Grand Cross of the Order of the Bath
  Knight of Malta

See also
 Jarnac Convention
 House of Rohan
 Rohan-Chabot genealogy

Notes

External links
 www.burkespeerage.com
 Harrow Register 1800-1900

1815 births
1875 deaths
19th-century French diplomats
Counts of France
Ambassadors of France to the United Kingdom
Philippe
Philippe
Knights of Malta
Honorary Knights Grand Cross of the Order of the Bath
Grand Officiers of the Légion d'honneur